Rocky Reach Dam is a run-of-the-river hydroelectric dam in the U.S. state of Washington owned and operated by Chelan County Public Utility District. It has 11 generators rated in total 1300 MW. The reservoir impounded by the dam is Lake Entiat. The project provides energy for more than 7 million people throughout the Pacific Northwest.

Rocky Reach is nationally recognized for efforts to protect the environment. A first-of-its-kind juvenile fish bypass system was completed in 2003 to help young salmon and steelhead on their way to the ocean. A major powerhouse upgrade started in 1995 includes new turbines that are more fish friendly. Improvements to turbines and generators are also designed to improve efficiency and reliability.

Tourism 
The visitor center shows films describing the Columbia River. The "Look a Salmon in the Eye" exhibit from (May–September) is a fish viewing room. The Powerhouse includes exhibits on the fourth floor. The Rocky Reach dam is near the Lincoln Rock State Park a short distance upriver. The Rocky Reach Dam was featured on an episode of Discovery Channel's Dirty Jobs, hosted by Mike Rowe.

History
In 1934 the United States Army Corps of Engineers first reported on the hydroelectric potential of this site. By the 1950s, studies were carried out by the Chelan County P.U.D. for detail design of the project. A preliminary permit was issued in 1954. In 1956 construction of the powerhouse and the first seven generating units began. Four more generators were installed starting in 1969, increasing nameplate capacity to 1287 megawatts. The original project cost was US $273.1 million, financed by bonds sold by the PUD. Project costs included relocation of highways and railroad, land acquisition, and relocation of the town of Entiat. Repayment of bonds was through revenues from long-term sales contracts between Chelan County Public Utility District and local industrial and distribution customers. The facility has been re-licensed until 2052.

The powerhouse now has seven Westinghouse generators and four Allis-Chalmers generators. The turbines are adjustable-blade Kaplan type to allow for efficient production of energy at varying water levels. Water flows through each of the first seven turbines at a rate of 116 thousand gallons per second and 145 thousand gallons per second through each of the remaining four turbines.

See also

List of dams in the Columbia River watershed
Hydroelectric dams on the Columbia River
List of reservoirs and dams in the United States

References

External links

 Rocky Reach Dam Website

Buildings and structures in Chelan County, Washington
Dams on the Columbia River
Dams in Washington (state)
Buildings and structures in Douglas County, Washington
Hydroelectric power plants in Washington (state)
United States local public utility dams
Dams completed in 1969
Energy infrastructure completed in 1956
Energy infrastructure completed in 1969
Gravity dams
Tourist attractions in Chelan County, Washington